Bojan Postružnik (31 May 1952 – 23 April 1989) was a Slovenian archer. He competed in the men's individual event at the 1976 Summer Olympics.

References

1952 births
1989 deaths
Slovenian male archers
Olympic archers of Yugoslavia
Archers at the 1976 Summer Olympics
Sportspeople from Maribor